Cristian Martínez Alejo (born 16 October 1989) is an Andorran footballer who plays as a right winger for FC Santa Coloma and the Andorra national team.

Club career
Born in Andorra la Vella, Martínez has played club football for FC Andorra, Lusitanos and Santa Coloma.

International career
Martínez has represented Andorra at youth level, playing for the under-17, under-19, and under-21 national teams. He made his senior debut in 2009.

International goals
Scores and results list Andorra's goal tally first.

References

1989 births
Living people
Andorran footballers
Andorra youth international footballers
Andorra under-21 international footballers
Andorra international footballers
FC Andorra players
FC Lusitanos players
FC Santa Coloma players
Association football wingers
Inter Club d'Escaldes players